Bally Pin is a pinball-based video game released in 1979 for Bally Astrocade. It was programmed by Bob Ogdon with sound by Scot L. Norris.

Gameplay 
The game is played with two joysticks by up to four players. Each player is given 5 balls. Players earn points by using the flippers to hit the bumpers, drop targets, upper kicker targets, and spinner.

Reception 
The game was considered the best pinball simulation ever offered for any home gaming system at the time.
Electronic Games magazine called the game skillfully constructed with realistic play and vivid colors.

References

External links 

 
Bally Pin instruction card at Bally Alley

1979 video games
Bally Astrocade games
Pinball video games
Video games developed in the United States